Nathan Clarke may refer to:
 Nathan Clarke (English footballer), English football centre-back
 Nathan Clarke (Australian footballer), Australian rules footballer
 Nathan Clarke (actor), British actor and voice actor

See also
 Nathan Clark, Vermont colonial and Revolutionary War leader